The Shalimar–Chennai Central Weekly Superfast Express is an Superfast train belonging to South Eastern Railway zone that runs between  and  in India. It is currently being operated with 22825/22826 train numbers on a weekly basis.

Service

The 22825/Shalimar–Chennai Central Weekly Superfast Express has an average speed of 64 km/hr and covers 1659 km in 25h 50m. The 22826/Chennai Central–Shalimar Weekly Superfast Express has an average speed of 59 km/hr and covers 1659 km in 28h 00m.

Route and halts 

The important halts of the train are:

 
 
 
 
 
 
 
 
 
  Eluru
  Vijayawada

Coach composition

The train has Modern LHB rakes with a max speed of 130 kmph. The train consists of 19 coaches:

 2 AC II Tier
 4 AC III Tier
 9 Sleeper coaches
 2 General Unreserved
 2 End on Generation (EOG) Coaches

Traction

Both trains are hauled by a Santragachi Loco Shed-based WAP-7 electric locomotive from Shalimar to Visakhapatnam. From Visakhapatnam, trains are hauled by a Lallaguda Loco Shed-based WAP-7 electric locomotive upto Chennai and vice versa.

Rake sharing

The train shares its rake with 22829/22830 Shalimar–Bhuj Weekly Superfast Express, 18009/18010 Santragachi–Ajmer Weekly Express and 22851/22852 Santragachi–Mangalore Central Vivek Express.

Direction reversal

The train reverses its direction 1 times:

See also 

 Shalimar railway station
 Chennai Central railway station
 Santragachi–Ajmer Weekly Express
 Shalimar–Bhuj Weekly Superfast Express
 Santragachi–Mangalore Central Vivek Express

Notes

References

External links 

 22825/Shalimar–Chennai Central Weekly Superfast Express India Rail Info
 22826/Chennai Central–Shalimar Weekly Superfast Express India Rail Info

Rail transport in Howrah
Transport in Chennai
Express trains in India
Rail transport in West Bengal
Rail transport in Odisha
Rail transport in Andhra Pradesh
Rail transport in Tamil Nadu
Railway services introduced in 2017